The Happy Prince is an animated short film adaptation of the short story by Oscar Wilde. The film was produced in 1974 by the Canadian-based Potterton Productions as a follow-up to its 1971 film The Selfish Giant.

Plot
A royal statue makes friends with a small swallow. The statue is moved by the suffering he sees around him and asks the swallow to peel off his gold covering leaf by leaf and give it to various poor and needy people.

Artists
Written for the screen and directed by Michael Mills
Master animator: Jim Hiltz
Animators: Robert Browning, Paul Driessen, Sebastian Grunstra, Julian Harris, Terence Harrison, Geoff Loynes, Gary Mooney, Paul Sabella, Paul Schibli, Don Stearn, Mike Stuart
Background design: Sue Butterworth, John Dawson, Diane Desrosiers, Timothy Elliott, Michel Guerin, Caroline Price
Sound editors: Peter Hearn, Gerard Senecal

Music
Howard Blake was originally hired to score the film, and after writing a theme for the bird, and a song, he called the director and found out they had hired Ron Goodwin without telling him.

References

External links
 BFI (UK): The Happy Prince
 

1974 in Canadian television
Canadian television specials
CTV Television Network original programming
Canadian animated short films
Films based on short fiction
Films based on works by Oscar Wilde
Films scored by Ron Goodwin
1974 television films
1974 films
1970s Canadian films